335 Squadron may refer to:

 335th Squadron (HAF), Greece
 335 Squadron, Royal Norwegian Air Force
 335th Airlift Squadron, United States
 335th Bombardment Squadron, United States
 335th Fighter Squadron, United States